Spangnak Ri is a mountain peak located at  above sea level in the far west of the Transhimalaya.

Location 

The peak is located in the South-west of Samad Rakchan village in Nyoma tehsil of Ladakh.

References 

Mountains of the Transhimalayas
Six-thousanders of the Transhimalayas
Mountains of Ladakh